Azul y Blanco (Spanish for 'Blue and White') was a semi-daily newspaper published from San Pedro Sula, Honduras. Politically, it had a Nationalist orientation.

Azul y Blanco was directed by Professor Manuel de J. Bueso. Marco A. Rápalo served as the Chief Editor and administrator of the newspaper. It was edited at Tipografía La Marina, owned by Ramón Discua.

References

1946 establishments in Honduras
1949 disestablishments in Honduras
Newspapers published in Honduras
Spanish-language newspapers